Retratos da Humanidade (Portuguese for "Portraits of Mankind") is the only release by Brazilian alternative rock band Revolucionnários. It came out in 2006 through label Champirado Records, founded by vocalist and bassist Champignon (formerly of Charlie Brown Jr.), and distributed by Universal Music Group. Produced by Tadeu Patolla (who had also collaborated with Charlie Brown Jr. previously) and mastered by Rodrigo Castanho (famous for his work with bands such as CPM 22 and NX Zero), the album spawned the hit singles "Revolucionnários" and "Como num Sonho Perfeito", described by Champignon as a tribute to singer Rita Lee and her band Os Mutantes. A music video, which counted with a guest appearance by actress Karina Bacchi, was made for the latter. Also notable is the track "Natureza", written shortly after Champignon's falling-out with Chorão which prompted him to leave Charlie Brown Jr.

The album was well received by critics at the time of its release, awarding Champignon his second Multishow Brazilian Music Award in 2007 in the "Best Instrumentalist" category – he had previously won the award in 2004, while still with Charlie Brown Jr.

An alternate, acoustic version of "Como num Sonho Perfeito" was later uploaded to the band's official Myspace profile.

Track listing

Personnel
 Champignon – vocals, beatboxing, bass guitar
 Nando Martins – electric guitar
 Pablo Silva – drums
 Fábio Kvêra – electric guitar
 Diego Righi – percussion
 Tadeu Patolla – production
 Rodrigo Castanho – mastering

References

2006 debut albums
Revolucionnários albums